Kanoon Meri Mutthi Mein is a 1984 Hindi-language action drama film directed by K. Prasad and produced by Dara Maruti. This multi starer movie was released in 1984 under the banner of Maruti Films. The Music of the film was composed by Raj Kamal.

Plot
Dacoits kill Bikram at the day of Rakhsha Bandhan. Bikram's sister Geeta seeks revenge for her brother's death and become a lady dacoit, renamed as Jwala. Police inspector Sagar is assigned to catch her but he falls in love with Geeta, unaware that the lady is actually Jwala, the infamous dacoit.

Cast
 Parveen Babi
 Smita Patil
 Raj Babbar
 Arun Govil
 Marc Zuber
 Suresh Oberoi
 Shakti Kapoor
 Kader Khan
 Ranjeet
 Paintal (comedian)
 Raza Murad
 Leena Das 
 Rehana Sultan

Soundtrack 
 Solha Saal Ki Sajan Teri- Salma Agha
 Maa Hu Na Suhagan Hu- Salma Agha
 Mummy Daddy Ko Bhagwaan - Chandrani Mukherjee, Rajeshwari
 Aate Hi Kahte Ho, Jana Hai Jaldi Hai - Asha Bhonsle
 Ingali Mungali Khaike - Asha Bhonsle

References

External links
 

1984 films
Films scored by Raj Kamal
1980s action drama films
1980s Hindi-language films
Indian action drama films
Films about outlaws
Indian Western (genre) films
Indian films about revenge
1984 Western (genre) films